The 2016–17 season was Colchester United's 80th season in their history and their first season competing in League Two following their relegation from League One in the 2015–16 season. It was their first season in the fourth tier of English football for 18-years. Along with competing in League Two, the club also participated in the FA Cup, EFL Cup and EFL Trophy.

Distinct changes in form and a series of lengthy squad injuries dictated Colchester's season. Many first-team players found themselves ruled out by injury, including Matthew Briggs, Kurtis Guthrie, Denny Johnstone, Frankie Kent, Lewis Kinsella, Doug Loft, Luke Prosser, Craig Slater, and Sammie Szmodics. Early season promise faded in late September with a winless run that stretched to the end of November. A turn in fortunes saw the U's win seven out of eight league games through December into January, earning John McGreal the December League Two Manager of the Month award. They again suffered patchy form from January onwards until a late push for the play-offs saw a return to form in April. Colchester fell just one point short of a play-off place on the final day of the League Two season, finishing in eighth position.

In the cup competitions, the U's were defeated in the first round of the EFL Cup and FA Cup by Brighton & Hove Albion and Chesterfield respectively, while they finished bottom of their group in the revamped EFL Trophy competition.

Season overview

Preseason
Colchester United announced their retained list on 20 May 2016. Darren Ambrose, Joe Edwards, Tosin Olufemi, Elliot Parish, Nicky Shorey and Marvin Sordell would all be leaving after the club decided to not renew their contracts following relegation to League Two. Three Academy products, Marley Andrews, Kieran Bailey and Tyler Brampton, would also leave the club upon the expiry of their deals.

Maldon & Tiptree's Ben Wyatt became Colchester's first signing of the season on 23 May when he signed a one-year contract with the club. On 25 May, Drey Wright signed a new one-year deal with the club. The following day, Jack Curtis became the second out-of-contract player to sign a new deal.

The club confirmed their first three pre-season friendlies on 31 May. Colchester would first take on Maldon & Tiptree on 9 July, then host Ipswich Town on 20 July, before a trip to Chelmsford City on 23 July.

On 2 June, Dillon Barnes committed his future to the club by signing a three-year deal. Colchester's League Two rivals Leyton Orient signed Gavin Massey for an undisclosed fee from the club on 8 June. Colchester's next transfer dealings came on 21 June, when Sammie Szmodics signed a new three-year contract with the club. Following this came news that former Southend United defender Luke Prosser had signed a two-year deal with the club after being released by Southend. Two players also left the club the same day, with Alex Gilbey joining Championship side Wigan Athletic after an undisclosed fee was agreed for the out-of-contract player, while George Moncur joined fellow Championship club Barnsley for reported fee of £500,000.

Colchester made their third and fourth summer signings on 28 June, bringing in Scottish striker Denny Johnstone from Birmingham City for an undisclosed fee, and Courtney Senior from Brentford on a free transfer. This followed news that Academy graduate Macauley Bonne had signed a two-year contract extension on 22 June.

Having spent the second half of the previous season on trial from Chelmsford City, defender Dexter Peter joined the club on a one-year contract on 29 June. Following Peter in joining Colchester was former Gillingham wide player Brennan Dickenson. Dickenson signed a two-year contract after his release from Gillingham. The following day, four under-18 players signed one-year development contracts with the club. Committing were defender JJ Wilson, midfielder and brother of Drey Wright, Diaz Wright, winger George Brown, and forward Decarrey Sheriff.

On 1 July, Colchester signed another ex-Gillingham player as Doug Loft joined on a two-year contract. On 4 July, Cameron James and Tariq Issa both signed new four-year deals with the club just one year after agreeing contracts until 2019. The following day, Colchester's longest serving player Tom Eastman signed a one-year contract extension.

Kurtis Guthrie became John McGreal's eighth summer signing on 6 July when he joined on a two-year contract from National League side Forest Green Rovers for an undisclosed fee. This followed news that Jamie Harney had agreed a new one-year deal with the club. On 7 July, Femi Akinwande became the final out-of-contract player to agree a new deal with the club, signing a new one-year deal. Later the same day, Colchester announced the arrival of midfielder Craig Slater from Kilmarnock for an undisclosed fee.

Colchester played their pre-season friendly fixture on 9 July away to Maldon & Tiptree. Two different sides turned out for either half, with Dexter Peter's effort separating the two teams at the interval. Former U's player Jamie Cureton turned out as a trialist for the Jammers for the second half. Colchester doubled their advantage through Macauley Bonne in the final ten minutes, before Matthew Briggs sealed the 3–0 victory late on.

In their second pre-season friendly, Szmodics scored a hat-trick against Needham Market with Chris Porter converting from the penalty spot in a 4–1 win for Colchester on 12 July. Their next fixture was a match against Welsh side Airbus UK Broughton while attending a training camp in Cheshire. Goals from Porter, Guthrie and a deflected Drey Wright shot were enough to hand the U's a 3–2 victory on 14 July.

Colchester's first home friendly was the regular pre-season fixture between the U's and neighbours Ipswich Town. Brett Pitman scored the only goal of the game to hand the visitors victory on 20 July. Another Szmodics hat-trick and Macauley Bonne's second goal of pre-season proved to be the difference between Colchester and Chelmsford City as they earned another 4–1 win on 23 July.

Premier League opposition visited the Colchester Community Stadium on 25 July with the visit of Crystal Palace. A Jordon Mutch goal separated the two sides as Colchester put in a strong performance but could not find the back of the net.

Ahead of their final pre-season friendly against Southend, the U's signed former Aston Villa defender Lewis Kinsella on a one-year contract. Colchester lost their game against Southend 2–0 on 30 July.

John McGreal appointed Luke Prosser as the new club captain on 4 August ahead of the season-opening fixture against Hartlepool United.

League Two

August
Colchester began the campaign away to Hartlepool United on 6 August. Tom Eastman scored inside five minutes to put Colchester ahead, but new signing Craig Slater brought down Nathan Thomas in the box and Billy Paynter converted the resulting penalty after 27-minutes to level the scores. The score remained the same in the second half in a game which saw a competitive debut for five Colchester players.

In the second week of the new league season, Colchester earned their first win of the campaign and John McGreal's first as manager as the U's won 2–0 at home against Cambridge United on 13 August. The goals came from Brennan Dickenson and Denny Johnstone, both goals being each player's first for the club. Dickenson's performance earned him a place in the English Football League Team of the Week for all three divisions. The same day, the club completed two transfer deals to assist the development squad. Young left-back JJ Wilson joined Maldon & Tiptree on loan for one month, while former Barnet trainee full-back Brendan Ocran signed a one-year development contract. Also leaving on loan was Jack Curtis, who joined Needham Market for one month, while George Elokobi was made available for loan.

In Colchester's first midweek game of the season on 16 August, the U's rushed to a 3–0 first-half lead over Grimsby Town at the Community Stadium. Brennan Dickenson scored his third goal in two games with a brace of goals in the 10th and 39th-minutes, separated by Kurtis Guthrie's first goal for the club. Grimsby fought back with an early second-half goal, and then pulled another goal back in the third minute of second-half stoppage time for a 3–2 result. Dickenson was named in the EFL Team of the Week for the second successive week as a result of his performance.

The U's were defeated 2–0 at Fratton Park on 20 August as Gary Roberts scored a brace for Portsmouth. A goal and assist from Chris Porter gave Colchester a 2–0 away victory at Wycombe Wanderers on 27 August with Sammie Szmodics also registering his first goal of the season.

Colchester bolstered their under-23 ranks with the signing of Welsh youth international Rhys Williams on 29 August. The club made two transfer deadline day loan signings of winger Tarique Fosu from Reading until 7 January 2017, and midfielder Glen Kamara for the same period.

It was announced on 6 September that John McGreal and Brennan Dickenson were in contention to win the League Two 'Manager of the Month' and 'Player of the Month' awards respectively.

September
After the English Football League transfer window had closed, National League side Lincoln City signed Macauley Bonne on loan initially until 26 October on 2 September.

Colchester's unbeaten home record for the season was ended by visitors Exeter City on 3 September. Robbie Simpson opened the scoring for Exeter after eight minutes, but Sammie Szmodics equalised with his second goal in as many league games after 13-minutes. The U's went ahead seven minutes from half-time when Kurtis Guthrie also scored his second goal of the season. However, Colchester conceded two second-half goals without reply to consign them to a 3–2 defeat.

After failing to break into Colchester's first-team squad, defender Jamie Harney's contract was terminated by mutual consent on 9 September.

Colchester bounced back from their 3–2 defeat against Exeter with a 3–2 win against Blackpool at home on 10 September. The visitors took the lead, but Sammie Szmodics registered his third goal in three league games to equalise nine minutes prior to the break. The U's took the lead after 56-minutes from Chris Porter's close range shot. Porter scored again to put Colchester further in front with six minutes to go, before Blackpool pulled one back through Brad Potts in the 89th minute. Porter's performance earned him a place in the EFL 'Team of the Week'.

Colchester travelled to Barnet on 17 September for their first ever game at The Hive. Loanee Tarique Fosu scored his first goal for the club after six minutes, and lead for 76 minutes by this margin until Curtis Weston scored an equaliser for Barnet.

Accrington Stanley left the Weston Homes Community Stadium with three points on their first visit on 24 September after beating Colchester 2–1. Drey Wright had scored his first goal of the season after seven-minutes, but two second-half goals from Romauld Boco and Billy Kee condemned the U's to their third defeat of the season.

Closing September with their second trip of the season to Broadfield Stadium, Colchester came away with a point, an improvement on their performance in the EFL Trophy. The hosts had taken the lead after 18-minutes, but Chris Porter scored his fourth goal of the season to rescue a point in the 88th minute of the game.

October

Colchester stretched their winless run to four games on 1 October with a 2–0 defeat in their away trip to Carlisle United. George Elokobi was loaned out to Braintree Town on 4 October for one month. Colchester signed free agent Lloyd Doyley on 7 October after having been signed to Championship side Rotherham United during the 2015–16 campaign.

Colchester hosted Newport County for the first time since the 1987–88 season on 8 October, with the Welsh club rooted to the bottom of the League Two table. The U's winless run stretched to six games without a win after a goalless draw. On 13 October, Jack Curtis' loan at Needham Market was extended until 12 November, while Colchester recalled Macauley Bonne from his loan spell at Lincoln.

Second-placed Doncaster Rovers hosted the U's on 15 October, and while Colchester had the better of the chances, Doncaster edged a 1–0 victory with a first-half injury time goal from Tommy Rowe separating the sides. A week later, Colchester had a great start against Morecambe when Chris Porter scored after four minutes of their first ever league encounter, and only the second meeting between the two sides. Goalkeeper Sam Walker saved a Morecambe penalty in the first-half, before Tom Barkhuizen equalised on 27-minutes. Porter scored his sixth goal of the season after converting a penalty six minutes before the interval. Morecambe earned a 2–2 draw when substitute Lee Molyneux scored in the 77th minute. Meanwhile, under-23 striker Femi Akinwande joined National League South side Bishop's Stortford for one month. Callum Harrison also left the club temporarily on 25 October, joining Needham Market for a second loan spell with the Isthmian League Premier Division side. Also leaving the club on loan was Ben Wyatt, who joined National League South outfit Concord Rangers for one month on 28 October.

Referee Kevin Johnson was forced to leave the field on a stretcher during Colchester's tie with Plymouth Argyle following a collision with Jimmy Spencer on 29 October. Craig Tanner had opened the scoring for the home side on 16 minutes, but a Craig Slater free kick levelled the score after 31-minutes. Following a ten-minute delay for Kevin Johnson's injury, Ryan Donaldson capitalised on a defensive mix-up to put his side 2–1 up. Plymouth held on for 16-minutes of injury time to condemn Colchester to a ninth consecutive game without victory.

November

Colchester attracted their largest crowd of the season on 12 November for their home game against Leyton Orient. The O's, who were in the relegation zone before kickoff, beat the U's 3–0 to drop Colchester to 22nd-position, just one point outside of the relegation places. Colchester slipped into the relegation zone on 19 November after they conceded two goals in the final four minutes of their game against Yeovil Town. Kurtis Guthrie's goal early in the second half was cancelled out by substitute François Zoko before fellow substitute Tahvon Campbell scored Yeovil's winner in the 90th minute.

The U's recalled George Elokobi from his loan at Braintree Town and he was handed his first start of the season for Colchester's game against Cheltenham Town on 22 November. Owen Garvan made his first appearance of the season, assisting a goal as Colchester earned their first victory in eleven League Two matches, moving them out of the bottom two. Craig Slater scored first in the 48th minute following a goalless first half, before Brennan Dickenson scored his fourth of the season on 65-minutes. Three minutes later, a Tom Eastman header from a Garvan corner kick gave the U's a three-goal advantage. The match ended 3–0 to Colchester, while Cheltenham had Harry Pell sent off for simulation in the 87th minute. They followed this up with their biggest win of the season, a 4–0 home win over Crewe Alexandra on 26 November. Kurtis Guthrie opened the scoring in the first-half, while Owen Garvan, Drey Wright and Brennan Dickenson scored in the second half to move the U's up to 15th.

December

Colchester opened December with a goalless draw at Mansfield Town on 10 December. They extended their unbeaten run to four games on 17 December with a 2–1 home win over Notts County. The visitors took the lead in the first half, but Kurtis Guthrie scored his fifth goal of the season to level the scores before the interval. A goalmouth scramble saw Richard Duffy score an own goal with 13-minutes remaining to hand the win to the U's.

Goalkeeper James Bransgrove announced his retirement from professional football on 21 December at the age of 21 to pursue a career in business. On 22 December, Colchester signed Jermaine Grandison on a contract until the end of the season after he impressed in games for the under-23 squad. The same day, Dion Sembie-Ferris joined Ben Wyatt at National League South side Concord Rangers on loan for one month.

The U's extended their run with an away win at Luton Town in their Boxing Day fixture. Craig Slater's third goal of the campaign proved the difference between the sides as Colchester returned to the top-half of the table. They then closed 2016 with another away win at Stevenage on 31 December. The U's took the lead after 15-minutes when Brennan Dickenson headed in a corner from Owen Garvan before Kurtis Guthrie added a second from the penalty spot after being fouled by former Colchester loanee Jamie Jones. Stevenage fought back with a goal late in the first half, and then equalised six minutes into the second half. Substitute Chris Porter scored his first goal since October following injury to reclaim the lead for his side, and then fellow substitute Tarique Fosu scored in injury time for a 4–2 victory.

January
Colchester started 2017 with a 2–0 win against Cheltenham Town at the Community Stadium. Tom Eastman scored his third goal of the season after 10-minutes, before Brennan Dickenson scored in the 84th minute for his seventh of the campaign to move the U's up to eighth in the League Two table. Dickenson was then named in the EFL 'Team of New Year' for the games played either side of New Year, while John McGreal was shortlisted for the 'Manager of the Month' award for December after securing ten points from a possible twelve for his side. McGreal became the first Colchester manager since Paul Lambert in January 2009 to be named 'Manager of the Month' on 6 January.

Colchester moved back into the play-off positions on 7 January after beating third-placed Carlisle United 4–1 to earn their fifth successive victory. Chris Porter scored in the eleventh minute to put the U's 1–0 ahead, but Brisley equalised with a looping header on 28-minutes. The U's retook the lead on 33-minutes when Kurtis Guthrie scored with a curling effort. He scored his second five minutes after half-time to put his side 3–1 ahead, and he completed his hat-trick in the fifth minute of injury time, moving the U's up to sixth in the table. He was subsequently named in the EFL 'Team of the Week'.

On 12 January, Tarique Fosu had his loan extended by the club until the end of the season, while fellow loanee Glen Kamara returned to Arsenal.

Colchester traveled to Newport County on 14 January, where their hosts held the U's to a 1–1 draw. Josh Sheehan opened the scoring for Newport, before Chris Porter converted a penalty kick in the 35th minute after Kurtis Guthrie had been fouled in the area.

On 18 January, the club announced that it was to part company with midfielder Jack Curtis. The same day, the club announced the signing of Eli Phipps from Cardiff City for an undisclosed fee on an 18-month contract. Further transfer activity followed on 20 January, with triallist Tommy O'Sullivan joining Eli Phipps in moving from Cardiff City for an undisclosed fee. He signed a contract until June 2018. Meanwhile, left-back Michael O'Donoghue left the club by mutual consent after making just one first-team appearance.

Colchester suffered their first defeat since 19 November when they lost 3–0 at in-form Exeter City on 21 January.

On 27 January, Macauley Bonne was sent out on loan for a second time to the National League, joining Woking for an initial month. On 30 January, Chris Regis became the third Academy player to leave the club in order to seek first-team football, while Rekeil Pyke joined the U's from Huddersfield Town on loan until the end of the season. Colchester completed two deadline day transfer deals on 31 January. The arrival of goalkeeper Dean Brill following his release from Motherwell would provide competition for Sam Walker and would allow Dillon Barnes to head out on loan, in response to the surprise retirement of James Bransgrove in December. Then, after having his contract terminated by Swindon Town earlier in the day, midfielder Sean Murray joined the U's on a one-and-a-half year deal.

February
On 3 February, Femi Akinwande made a loan return to his former club Maldon & Tiptree, joining the Jammers for an initial one-month loan.

A trip to Blackpool on 4 February saw the U's return with a point after a battling draw. Jamille Matt had opened the scoring for the home side after 12-minutes, but Kurtis Guthrie's tenth goal of the season gave Colchester a share of the points six minutes later. Debutant Sean Murray was sent off for a bad tackle on Jim McAlister in the fifth minute of injury time. Matthew Briggs made his first competitive appearance of the season following a long injury layoff. Colchester's next game at home to Barnet on 11 February saw two central defenders forced off with injury within the first 15-minutes. Frankie Kent was replaced by Alex Wynter and Lloyd Doyley by Matthew Briggs. Despite the defensive setback, the U's took the lead following Kurtis Guthrie's long range shot on 18-minutes. Their advantage was doubled prior to half-time by Brennan Dickenson. Barnet scored a late goal but Colchester held on for a 2–1 victory.

The U's suffered their first home defeat since November on 14 February after Crawley Town won 3–2 at the Community Stadium. Denny Johnstone scored his second goal for the club to give the hosts an 18th-minute lead, but a hat-trick from Jimmy Smith put Colchester 3–1 down by the 51st-minute. A late consolation goal from Brennan Dickenson reduced the deficit, while both Charley Edge and Rekeil Pyke made their professional debuts from the bench as the club slipped to 10th in the league table. Colchester then suffered their first back-to-back defeats since November when they lost 2–1 at Accrington Stanley on 18 February. First-half goals from Billy Kee and Matty Pearson handed Accrington the advantage before Omar Beckles was shown a red card for a tackle on Brennan Dickenson just before the break. Chris Porter scored his tenth goal of the season from the penalty spot but it proved only to be a consolation.

Colchester earned a 1–0 win against Wycombe Wanderers on 21 February to leapfrog them into 7th-position and the play-off places. George Elokobi scored with a long range effort on 13-minutes, and the U's held on for the remainder of the game, while the visitors had defender Joe Jacobson sent off for a second bookable offence two minutes from full-time.

Both Frankie Kent and Denny Johnstone were ruled out for the remainder of the season during February following injuries sustained during the games against Barnet and Accrington Stanley respectively.

The U's remained in the play-off places on 25 February following a 2–1 win at home to Hartlepool United. Second-half goals from Kurtis Guthrie and Chris Porter secured the win for Colchester, despite Hartlepool pulling a goal back eight minutes from full-time. They were then defeated 1–0 at Grimsby Town on 28 February which pushed them back out of the play-off positions and into ninth.

March
March began with more injury problems for Colchester, with Craig Slater and Kurtis Guthrie requiring operations which would rule them out for the remainder of the season. Meanwhile, Femi Akinwande joined his third loan club of the season, signing with National League South East Thurrock United for one month on 3 March.

Sammie Szmodics scored on his return from injury to earn Colchester a point away at Cambridge United on 4 March. After going behind in the 20th minute, substitute Szmodics scored with six minutes remaining to salvage a point for the injury-stricken U's, while both sides also had goals disallowed.

On 10 March, it was announced that Director of Football Tony Humes and Director of Football Operations Tony Ashby had been added to board of directors at the club.

Colchester failed to register a shot on target in their home game against Portsmouth on 11 March when they were beaten 4–0, remaining three points off the play-off positions. They followed this up with a 2–0 home win against Mansfield Town on 14 March, Brennan Dickenson and Sammie Szmodics the goalscorers for the U's in the first-half.

After scoring in the midweek game, Sammie Szmodics broke his leg in Colchester's 2–0 defeat at Crewe Alexandra on 18 March. For their following game, Tom Eastman returned to the starting line-up for Colchester's game against Luton Town at the Community Stadium on 25 March. Two Chris Porter goals in the first-half were enough to decide the match, while Luton scored a consolation through Isaac Vassell in the third minute of stoppage time. Porter was named in the EFL Team of the Week for his performance against Luton.

Having failed to break into the Colchester United first-team, Jermaine Grandison was released on 29 March without making an appearance for the club.

April
Colchester travelled to Notts County for their first game of the month on 1 April. The home side opened the scoring after eight minutes, but Chris Porter's third goal in two games evened the game on 21-minutes. Shola Ameobi scored either side of the half-time break to record a 3–1 victory for County, leaving the U's five points off the playoff positions. They followed this up by equalling their best result of the season with a 4–0 win at home to Stevenage. Brennan Dickenson's eleventh goal of the campaign arrived on 12-minutes, and Chris Porter scored his 15th goal of the season after 30-minutes. Two own goals by Josh McQuoid on 34-minutes and Charlie Lee on 39-minutes sealed Colchester's win before the half-time break. The score remained the same in the second half, while Tommy O'Sullivan came on to make his club debut twelve minutes from time. Winger Tarique Fosu was named Man of the Match and earned a place in the EFL 'Team of the Week' for his performance after playing a part in two of Colchester's goals.

Midfielder Owen Garvan had his contract cancelled by mutual consent on 11 April citing personal reasons for his departure.

On Good Friday, Colchester held league leaders and already promoted Doncaster Rovers to a 1–1 draw at the Community Stadium. Brennan Dickenson opened the scoring after 16-minutes, before the visitors equalised in first-half injury time.

Colchester were held to a 1–1 draw at Morecambe on Easter Monday having held a 1–0 lead following Richard Brindley's free kick in the 22nd minute until the 88th, when former Colchester defender Michael Rose equalised from the penalty spot. This left the U's two points from the play-off places with three games remaining. A third consecutive draw followed on 22 April when they played out a goalless draw with second-placed Plymouth Argyle at the Community Stadium, leaving Colchester three points outside the play-off places with two games remaining.

With Colchester looking to make the play-off places, they travelled to already relegated Leyton Orient on 29 April. The U's took the lead through Tarique Fosu on 26-minutes, but shortly after the half-time break, former Colchester youth team player Sandro Semedo equalised. Chris Porter and Macauley Bonne both scored for Colchester to make it 3–1 before the 85th-minute, when Orient supporters stormed the pitch to protest the running of the club. With supporters refusing to move from the pitch, the match was abandoned an hour after the initial delay in play. Two hours following the postponement, the players returned to the pitch in front of an empty stadium to play out the final five minutes plus three for stoppage time which sealed the 3–1 result for Colchester.

May
Ahead of Colchester's final game of the season, it was revealed that Brennan Dickenson had sustained cruciate ligament damage during training that would leave him sidelined for up to nine months. Tarique Fosu's brace of goals in Colchester's 2–0 win against Yeovil on 6 May were not enough to lift the U's into the play-off places after results elsewhere went against them, meaning they finished the campaign in eighth position just one point outside the play-offs.

EFL Cup
McGreal named seven changes to his squad that drew 1–1 with Hartlepool on the opening day of the season for their EFL Cup tie with Championship side Brighton & Hove Albion, including debuts for young goalkeeper Dillon Barnes, Brennan Dickenson, and Doug Loft. Colchester were dominated by Brighton but managed to go into the half-time break at 0–0. Three goals in ten second-half minutes effectively ended the U's chances, before a fourth was added four-minutes from time.

EFL Trophy
In the new-look EFL Trophy group stage, Colchester lost their first game 1–0 to Crawley Town on 30 August, but handed first-team debuts for Dexter Peter and Diaz Wright. Colchester also lost their second game at home to Southampton U23 on 4 October. Sam McQueen opened the scoring for the visitors after eight minutes, before Dion Sembie-Ferris scored his first goal for the club on 23-minutes. Tariq Issa replaced Sembie-Ferris at half-time to make his debut for the club, before Olufela Olomola scored the winner six minutes later. Unable to progress to the knock-out phase of the competition, Colchester hosted Charlton Athletic in their third and final match on 8 November in front of a crowd of just 548. Charlton took the lead through Nicky Ajose, but Macauley Bonne scored his first goal of the season three minutes from half-time to level the score. Unable to find a winner, the game ended in a draw, with the final bonus point decided by penalties. Dillon Barnes made two saves to earn his side a 4–3 penalty shoot-out win.

FA Cup
Drawn against League One Chesterfield, Colchester drew a crowd of just 1,840 for their FA Cup first round fixture. Chesterfield took the lead in the first half, but half-time substitute Tarqiue Fosu equalised immediately following the break. Chesterfield striker Ched Evans restored the visitors lead four minutes later, and Chesterfield held on to win 2–1.

Players

First-team squad

Under-23s

Match details

Preseason friendlies

League Two

Results round by round

League table

Matches

EFL Cup

EFL Trophy

FA Cup

Squad statistics

Appearances and goals

|-
!colspan="14"|Players who appeared for Colchester who left during the season

|}

Goalscorers

Disciplinary record

Player debuts
Players making their first-team Colchester United debut in a fully competitive match.

Transfers and contracts

In

Out

Loans in

Loans out

Contracts
New contracts and contract extensions.

Honours and awards

End-of-season awards

See also
List of Colchester United F.C. seasons

References

2016-17
2016–17 EFL League Two by team